The Ruling Passion is a 1922 American silent comedy film directed by F. Harmon Weight and written by Forrest Halsey based upon a short story by Earl Derr Biggers. The film stars George Arliss, Doris Kenyon, Edmund Burns, Ida Darling, J. W. Johnston, and Ernest Hilliard. The film was released on January 22, 1922, by United Artists. A print of The Ruling Passion survives at Gosfilmofond in Moscow. In 1931, Arliss starred in a talkie remake, The Millionaire.

Plot
As described in a film magazine, James Alden (Arliss), a kind-hearted philanthropist, is persuaded to retire from the automobile manufacturing business by his wife (Darling) and daughter Angie (Kenyon), and he accepts the advise of his physician Dr. Stillings (Darley) and goes to live quietly at his Long Island home. Being active and healthy, however, he is not contented, and secretly buys an interest in an automobile repair garage with Bill Merrick (Burns), a young man just back from overseas. James assumes the name John Grant for this, and complications arise when Angie meets Bill, who does not know that his partner is her father. The man they purchased the garage from threatens to force them out of business. Bill, feeling sorry for his partner who "has a wife and daughter depending on him," decides to apply to James Alden for help, because his partner John Grant stated he worked for him for years. James refuses the request for aid, however, and Angie tenders her own check to Bill. Finally, when Bill goes to ask for Angie's hand in marriage, James has to confess to the astonished young man that he is also his partner. James has won back his health and a new son-in-law.

Cast 
 George Arliss as James Alden
 Doris Kenyon as Angie Alden
 Edmund Burns as 'Bill' Merrick 
 Ida Darling as Mrs. Alden
 J. W. Johnston as Peterson 
 Ernest Hilliard as Carter Andrews
 Harold Waldridge as Al
 Brian Darley as Dr. Stillings

References

External links

1922 films
American silent feature films
American black-and-white films
1920s English-language films
United Artists films
Silent American comedy films
1922 comedy films
1920s American films